Reuben Chapman (July 15, 1799 – May 17, 1882) was an American lawyer and politician.

Life
Born on July 15, 1799, in Bowling Green, Virginia, he moved to Alabama in 1824, where he established a law practice. He represented Alabama in the U.S. House of Representatives from March 4, 1835, to March 3, 1847, and served as the 13th Governor of the U.S. state of Alabama from 1847 to 1849. He died in Huntsville, Alabama on May 17, 1882. While a member of the House of Representatives, he had a very contentious relationship with the French ambassador, Louis Adolphe Aimé Fourier, comte de Bacourt. In 1844 the ambassador had made remarks towards him, and Virginia congressman George W. Hopkins, and Chapman challenged Louis Adolphe Aimé Fourier, comte de Bacourt to a duel. However, the French ambassador backed down. That same year the French ambassador also offended Virginia congressman Lewis Steenrod, though it is unknown precisely what words were exchanged. Chapman and Hopkins grew so hostile towards the French ambassador that in 1846, President James K. Polk eventually asked the French government to send Monsieur Fourier home and select a new ambassador to the United States.

References

Sources
Biographic sketch at U.S. Congress website
Alabama Department of Archives and History
Reuben Chapman 1847-1849- Encyclopedia of Alabama 
Governor Reuben Chapman by Thomas McAdory Owen · 1921

External links
Biographic sketch at U.S. Congress website
Alabama Department of Archives and History
Reuben Chapman 1847-1849- Encyclopedia of Alabama

1799 births
1882 deaths
People from Bowling Green, Virginia
Democratic Party governors of Alabama
Jacksonian members of the United States House of Representatives from Alabama
19th-century American politicians